Qolqəti (also, Kolgaty) is a village and municipality in the Agdash Rayon of Azerbaijan. It has a population of 1,329.

References

See also
Aşağı Qolqəti
Yuxarı Qolqəti

Populated places in Agdash District